The men's 100 metres event at the 2019 Asian Athletics Championships was held on 21 and 22 April.

Medalists

Results

Heats
Qualification rule: First 4 in each heat (Q) and the next 4 fastest (q) qualified for the semifinals.

Wind:Heat 1: +1.2 m/s, Heat 2: +0.8 m/, Heat 3: +0.9 m/s, Heat 4: +0.5 m/, Heat 5: -0.2 m/s

Semifinals
Qualification rule: First 2 in each heat (Q) and the next 2 fastest (q) qualified for the final.

Wind:Heat 1: +1.2 m/s, Heat 2: +1.4 m/, Heat 3: +1.7 m/s

Final
Wind: +1.5 m/s

References

100
100 metres at the Asian Athletics Championships